Ireland competed at the 1988 Summer Olympics in Seoul, South Korea. 61 competitors, 52 men and 9 women, took part in 47 events in 12 sports.

Competitors
The following is the list of number of competitors in the Games.

Archery

In Ireland's fourth appearance in archery competition at the Olympics, the nation was represented by two men and one woman.

Women's Individual Competition:
 Pereira Greene — Preliminary Round (→ 38th place)

Men's Individual Competition:
 Joseph Malone — Preliminary Round (→ 69th place)
 Noel Lynch — Preliminary Round (→ 74th place)

Athletics

Men's Marathon 
 Dick Hooper 
 Final — 2"17.16 (→ 24th place)
 
 John Woods 
 Final — 2"25.38 (→ 52nd place)

Men's 3.000m Steeplechase
 Brendan Quinn
 Heat — 8:40.87
 Semi Final — 8:43.34 (→ did not advance)

Men's Hammer Throw
 Connor McCullagh
 Qualifying Heat — 68.66m (→ did not advance)

Men's Javelin Throw 
 Terry McHugh
 Qualification — 76.46m (→ did not advance)

Men's Decathlon 
 Carlos O'Connell — 7310 points (→ 29th place) 
 100 metres — 11.26s
 Long Jump — 6.90m
 Shot Put — 12.41m
 High Jump — 1.88m
 400 metres — 48.24s
 110m Hurdles — 15.61s
 Discus Throw — 38.02m
 Pole Vault — 4.40m
 Javelin Throw — 52.68m
 1.500 metres — 4:32.06s

Women's 3.000m Steeplechase
 Anne Keenan-Buckley

Women's Marathon 
 Ailish Smyth 
 Final — 2"44.17 (→ 46th place)

 Marie Murphy-Rollins 
 Final — 3"04.21 (→ 57th place)

Boxing

Men's Light Flyweight (– 48 kg)
 Wayne McCullough
 First Round — Bye
 Second Round — Defeated Fred Mutuweta (Uganda), 5:0
 Third Round — Lost to Scott Olsen (Canada), 0:5

Canoeing

Cycling

Five male cyclists represented Ireland in 1988.

Men's road race
 Cormac McCann
 John McQuaid
 Paul McCormack

Men's team time trial
 Philip Cassidy
 Cormac McCann
 John McQuaid
 Stephen Spratt

Equestrianism

Judo

Rowing

Men's Coxled Pairs
 Pat McDonagh — 2nd in repechage (→ Unplaced)
 Frank Moore — 2nd in repechage (→ Unplaced)
 Liam Williams — 2nd in repechage (→ Unplaced)

Sailing

Swimming

Men's 200m Freestyle
 Stephen Cullen
 Heat — 1:57.90 (→ did not advance, 50th place)

 Richard Gheel
 Heat — 2:01.73 (→ did not advance, 57th place)

Men's 100m Backstroke
 Stephen Cullen
 Heat — 58.82 (→ did not advance, 29th place)

 Richard Gheel
 Heat — 59.37 (→ did not advance, 36th place)

Men's 200m Backstroke
 Richard Gheel
 Heat — 2:05.71 (→ did not advance, 25th place)

 Stephen Cullen
 Heat — 2:06.98 (→ did not advance, 27th place)

Men's 100m Breaststroke
 Gary O'Toole
 Heat — 1:05.34 (→ did not advance, 34th place)

Men's 200m Breaststroke
 Gary O'Toole
 Heat — 2:18.93 (→ did not advance, 18th place)

Men's 200m Individual Medley
 Gary O'Toole
 Heat — 2:07.77 (→ did not advance, 20th place)

Women's 100m Backstroke
 Michelle Smith
 Heat — 1:06.22 (→ did not advance, 27th place)

 Aileen Convery
 Heat — 1:06.73 (→ did not advance, 29th place)

Women's 200m Backstroke
 Michelle Smith
 Heat — 2:19.50 (→ did not advance, 17th place)

 Aileen Convery
 Heat — 2:19.91 (→ did not advance, 18th place)

Women's 200m Individual Medley
 Michelle Smith
 Heat — 2:25.53 (→ did not advance, 26th place)

Women's 400m Individual Medley
 Michelle Smith
 Heat — 5:01.84 (→ did not advance, 25th place)

Tennis

Men's Doubles Competition
 Owen Casey and Eoin Collins 
 First Round — Lost to Amos Mansdorf and Gilad Bloom (Israel) 2-6 6-7 6-4 5-7

Wrestling

References

Nations at the 1988 Summer Olympics
1988 in Irish sport
Ireland at the Summer Olympics by year